James Sharpe (alias Pollard) (1577–1630) was an English Jesuit and professor of scripture who had been a celebrated convert and prisoner in his own home.

Born in York, he converted when young, and made his priestly studies at the English College, Valladolid. He was ordained in 1604, and returned to England in 1606, where a trial awaited him. Believing that he must convert his parents to Catholicism, he visited them in Everingham, but was kept a prisoner at home, and subjected to pressure, threats, violence, and constant surveillance to induce him to renounce Catholicism.  While his mother begged him to yield, his father begged the authorities rather to keep him under house arrest in England, than to let him go into exile. But the "Annals" of his college state that Sharpe was a man "of great courage and learning".  He was eventually taken to the archbishop's prison, then deported. Having entered the Society of Jesus (1608), he became professor of Scripture at the Catholic University of Leuven for three years, after which he returned, and worked on the English mission until his death. He wrote The Trial of Protestant Private Spirit. (s.l., 1630)

References

17th-century English Jesuits
1577 births
1630 deaths
English College, Valladolid alumni
Converts to Roman Catholicism
Clergy from York
16th-century English Jesuits